Mountain View is a neighborhood in northeast Anchorage, Alaska, with approximately 7,300 residents. Mountain View is the most diverse neighborhood in the United States. It is between the Glenn Highway and Elmendorf Air Force Base, west of McCarrey Street and east of Post Road. It is a working-class neighborhood, with a median household income of approximately $51,000 and a poverty rate of approximately 26%.

History 

The neighborhood began in the 1940s as housing for Elmendorf Air Force Base construction workers. It became blighted in the 1980s, followed by extensive revitalization efforts in the 2000s.

Transportation

Mountain View is one of the highest-ridership, residential neighborhoods on the People Mover system; the former #45 route is the highest-ridership route in the system. On 23 October 2017, it was split into two routes: The primary #20 route which runs from Downtown to the Alaska Native Medical Center via Commercial Drive & Bragaw Street, and the #21 which circulates through the neighborhood before continuing down Mountain View Drive to the Northway Mall and downtown Anchorage.

References 

Neighborhoods in Anchorage, Alaska